Julie Catherine Manning (born 24 January 1939) was a Tanzanian lawyer, judge and politician. The first Tanzanian woman to study law, she was a High Court judge before serving as Minister of Justice from 1975 to 1983.

Life
Manning was born in Morogoro. In 1963, she became the first woman to study law at the University of East Africa. She later worked as a law draughtswoman in the Attorney General's Chamber. In 1973 she was appointed judge of the High Court of Tanzania, making her the first African woman High Court judge in east or central Africa.She was named Minister of Justice in 1975, making her one of the first two women to serve in a Tanzanian cabinet.

After Joseph Warioba succeeded Manning as Justice Minister in 1983, she worked as a counsel at the Tanzanian embassy in Ottawa,  Canada.

See also
List of first women lawyers and judges in Africa

References

1939 births
Living people
20th-century Tanzanian judges
Tanzanian politicians
Women judges
Tanzanian women lawyers
20th-century Tanzanian women politicians